Goodenia affinis, commonly known as silver goodenia, is a species of flowering plant in the family Goodeniaceae and endemic to the southwest of Western Australia. It is an erect to low-lying, perennial herb with oblong to egg-shaped leaves, mostly at the base of the plant, racemes of yellow flowers with linear bracteoles at the base, and oblong fruit.

Description

Taxonomy and naming
Silver goodenia was first formally described in 1845 by Willem Hendrik de Vriese and given the name Scaevola geniculata in Johann Georg Christian Lehmann's book Plantae Preissianae. In 1854, de Vriese changed the name to Goodenia affinis in the journal Natuurkundige Verhandelingen van de Hollandsche Maatschappij der Wetenschappen te Haarlem. The specific epithet (affinis) means "similar to a closely-related species".

Distribution and habitat
Goodenia affinis grows in mallee from King George Sound to the western end of the Great Australian Bight in the Avon Wheatbelt, Coolgardie, Esperance Plains, Geraldton Sandplains and Mallee biogeographic regions in the southwest of Western Australia.

References

affinis
Endemic flora of Western Australia
Plants described in 1845
Taxa named by Willem Hendrik de Vriese